KKWB (102.5 FM, "Coyote 102.5") is a country music radio station, serving the Bemidji, Minnesota region. Its main source of programming is from the Westwood One radio network, along with hourly news from the CBS Radio Network. It is owned and operated by Bemidji Radio, Inc., a division of De La Hunt Broadcasting in Park Rapids, Minnesota.

Their "showcase" studios are in the Elks building, at 4th & Beltrami in downtown Bemidji. The transmitter site is west of Blackduck, Minnesota. It broadcasts from a 472-foot tower, with 50,000 watts.

The station was assigned the KKWB call letters by the Federal Communications Commission on May 13, 2008.

References

External links
KKWB official website
De La Hunt Broadcasting

Radio stations in Minnesota
Country radio stations in the United States
Radio stations established in 2008